Ceromya amblycera is a species of tachinid flies in the genus Ceromya of the family Tachinidae. It was originally placed in the genus Actia, but was moved to Ceromya by James E. O'Hara in 1989. It is known from Argentina.

References

Tachininae
Diptera of South America
Taxa named by John Merton Aldrich
Insects described in 1934